Gregory II of Cyprus (1241–1290) was Ecumenical Patriarch of Constantinople between 1283 and 1289.

Gregory was born in Lapithos, Cyprus.  His name was originally George. His parents were middle class but of noble origin. He moved to Nicosia as a teenager seeking further education. Not satisfied by the level of education provided by local teachers in Greek, he became a student at a Latin school (available then as Cyprus was a Crusader kingdom). He had difficulty learning Latin and thus got only a superficial knowledge of grammar and Aristotle's Logic.

Still determined to get a decent education, he got on a ship to Acre, Palestine, where he arrived after three days. From there he travelled to Anaea in Asia Minor and finally made it to Mount Galesios near Ephesos. He had heard a lot about the scholar Nicephorus Blemmydes but was disappointed by him and moved to Nicaea where he studied with George Acropolites. With the recapture of Constantinople by Nicaean forces in 1261, he moved there. Later he became a teacher, his students including Nikephoros Choumnos.

He became patriarch in 1283. The orthodox and the catholic churches had proclaimed their union in 1274 in the Second Council of Lyons, motivated more by the emperor's politics than by theological arguments. Gregory, contrary to his predecessor refused to accept the filioque clause added to the Nicene creed by the Roman Catholics.  Gregory spoke of an eternal manifestation of the Spirit by the Son. Gregory's formula has been considered an Orthodox "answer" to the filioque, though it does not have the status of official Orthodox doctrine. Gregory's perception of Trinity was endorsed by the council of Blachernae in 1285.

Works 
Gregory wrote collections of proverbs, his own autobiography, and a series of rhetorical exercises, as well as hagiographical and doctrinal works. He also left a collection of letters.

 Paroemiae (Proverbs):  
 Epistola ad Joannem II sebastocratorem Thessaliae (Epistle to John II, sebastokrator of Thessaly): 
 Tomus fidei (Explanatory tome of the Orthodox faith): 
 Progymnasmata (Rhetorical exercises): 
 De vita sua (On his own life; autobiography): 
 Contra Synesium, sive comae encomium (Against Synesius; or, hair praise): 
 Vita sancti Lazari (Life of St. Lazarus): 
 Oratio antirrhetica contra Joannem Beccum (Discourse against John Bekkos): 
 Epistulae ad Theodoram Rhaulenam (Letters to Theodora Rhaulena): 
 Encomium maris, sive de universa aquae natura (Sea praise; or, on the Nature of Water):

Sources

External links
 Myriobiblos
 Tomos of the Blachernae Council

1241 births
1289 deaths
13th-century patriarchs of Constantinople
13th-century Byzantine writers
Autobiographers
Byzantine writers
Christian writers
Cypriot biographers
Cypriot schoolteachers
Eastern Orthodox Christians from Cyprus